The greenish schiffornis (Schiffornis virescens), also greenish mourner or greenish manakin (not to be confused with the green manakin), is a species of bird in the family Tityridae. It has traditionally been placed in the manakin family, but evidence strongly suggest it is better placed in Tityridae, where it is now placed by the South American Classification Committee.

It is found in southern Brazil, also eastern Paraguay, and extreme northeastern Argentina. Its natural habitats are subtropical or tropical moist lowland forest, subtropical or tropical moist montane forest, and heavily degraded former forest.

The egg shapes for this bird can range from oval to elliptical shapes. It usually breeds between October and February, which is a common breeding time for forest birds.

References

External links
 "Greenish schiffornis" videos on the Internet Bird Collection
Greenish schiffornis photo gallery VIREO Photo-High Res
Photo-High Res; Article ib.usp.br—"Tityridae"
Marini, Miguel Angelo, and Neander Marcel Heming. "Breeding of the Greenish Schiffornis (Schiffornis virescens, Tityridae)." REVISTA BRASILEIRA DE ORNITOLOGIA 25.4 (2017): 269–272.

greenish schiffornis
Birds of Brazil
Birds of the Atlantic Forest
greenish schiffornis
Taxonomy articles created by Polbot
Birds of Paraguay